The Polish Left is a centre-left to left-wing political party in Poland.

History
Former Prime Minister Leszek Miller announced the formation of the Polish Left on September 20, 2007, because he was not on the list of Left and Democrats. In his announcement, Miller said that the new party would be a "true leftist" alternative to the LiD coalition. In 2007 election Leszek Miller started from Self-Defence of the Republic of Poland.

The Polish Left party was formed when the Prime Minister and many other members of parliament withdrew from the Democratic Left Alliance, which Miller had headed for many years. His departure from the DLA also served as a public protest against the policies of party leaders, regarded by the protesters as not liberal enough.

Miller was the leader of the party from 2001 to 2004. Other prominent members are the former Secretary General of the DLA, Marek Dyduch, and former Sejm Member Krzysztof Jagiełło.

Before 2019 election Polish Left got into litigations with Democratic Left Alliance and put up three candidates for senators including Monika Jaruzelska who was criticized by some left-wing politicians for conservatives views. Leszek Miller, current MEP from SLD declared that it is likely to create a new leftist party or coalition in opposition to the SLD and The Left.

References

External links
Official site

2007 establishments in Poland
Political parties established in 2007
Political parties in Poland
Social democratic parties in Poland
Social democratic parties
Democratic socialist parties